The 2000–01 Moldovan Cup was the tenth edition of the Moldovan annual football tournament.

Round of 16
The first legs were played on 24 October 2000. The second legs were played on 8 November 2000.

|}

Quarterfinals

The first legs were played on 14 March 2001. The second legs were played on 4 April 2001.

|}

Semifinals
The first legs were played on 18 April 2001. The second legs were played on 2 May 2001.

|}

Final

References
 Moldova - 2000/01 season (RSSSF)

Moldovan Cup seasons
Moldovan Cup 2000-01
Moldova